The Russian Journal of Genetics is a monthly peer-reviewed scientific journal covering genetics. It was established in 1994 and is published by Springer Science+Business Media. The editor-in-chief is Nikolay Yankovsky (Vavilov Institute of General Genetics). According to the Journal Citation Reports, the journal has a 2020 impact factor of 0.581.

References

External links

Genetics journals
English-language journals
Publications established in 1994
Monthly journals
Springer Science+Business Media academic journals